De Veenhuis is a hamlet in the Dutch province of Gelderland. It is a part of the municipality of Nijkerk, and lies about 6 km north of Amersfoort.

It was first mentioned in 1453 as "op Veenhusen", and means "houses on the moorland". The postal authorities have placed it under Nijkerk. In 1840, it was home to 190 people. De Veenhuis has no place name signs, and nowadays consists of about 10 houses.

References

Populated places in Gelderland
Nijkerk